Mirabilandia is a 210-acre theme park, located in Savio, Italy, a frazione of Ravenna, which is located in Emilia-Romagna. With a total area of 850,000 square metres, it is the biggest park in Italy.

It has an area of 55 hectares, with an additional waterpark area of 12 hectares, called Mirabeach. The most notable attractions are the Katun inverted roller coaster and the iSpeed launched coaster.
It has the world's tallest watercoaster, the "Divertical" with a height of 60 m.
It also has the only spike dueling coaster in the world: Desmo Race.

It houses the 92-metre tall Eurowheel, Europe's second tallest Ferris wheel.

History
The themed areas present today are:
Route 66 (Italy sixties);
Ducati World
Adventureland (a leafy area)
Bimbopoli (children's area)
Dinoland (dinosaurs' area)
Far West Walley (cowboys' area)

The park opened its doors on 4 July 1992, located next to the pine grove in Classe, on the Adriatica state road, among the first shareholders there was Silvio Berlusconi. 

Among its opening-day attractions was Sierra Tonante, a wooden roller coaster, and Rio Bravo, a water itinerary among the rapids aboard special rafts where still today it is possible to have a great time.

But in 1996 the park was in danger of bankruptcy, so the next year it's sold to the Loeffelhardt-Casoli group (joint venture between the company that owns Phantasialand and the Italian Casoli)

In 1997, the 60-metre-tall Torri Gemelle (today Oil Towers) and the Scuola di Polizia stunt show were added. New scenery and theming depicting exotic and fantastic places was also added. Most prominently, the entrance plaza rethemed and renamed Pirate Bay. The restaurants had a similar re-theming (like the "Locanda del Faro").

In 1998, Pakal (today Gold Digger), a wild mouse roller coaster, was added.

In 1999, the 92-metre-tall Eurowheel, the tallest Ferris wheel in Europe at the time, Niagara (today El Dorado Falls), and the Mirabilandia Express opened.

In 2000 has opened Katun, the longest inverted roller coaster in Europe, themed with the city of Sian Ka'an that is a big  Mayan zone around the coaster. 

In 2003, Mirabilandia Beach (today Mirabeach), a water park, was added. It was expanded in 2004.

Following the success, in 2006, the Spanish company Parques Reunidos, one of the leading companies in the amusement parks sector, became interested in the park and bought it.

In the following years, Leprotto Express, Raratonga, and Reset, the first interactive dark ride in Italy, were added. 

In 2009, iSpeed, a launched roller coaster, opened, replacing Sierra Tonante (which had closed in 2007) and becoming the tallest and fastest roller coaster in Italy, featuring an acceleration of 0 to 100 km/h in 2.2 seconds. 

In 2011 Master Thai, the first dueling roller coaster in Italy was added.

In 2012, Divertical, the tallest water coaster in the world was inaugurated. 

In 2014, the children's area Dinoland opened with attractions including Reptilium, Raptotana, Rexplorer, Bicisauro, Brontocars, and Monosauro. 

In 2015 the stunt show got a partnership with Hot Wheels and a 18 metres in height mobile loop, the tallest loop in the world made by a car.

In 2016, the Far West Valley area opened its doors, featuring the largest Horror House in Europe, Legends of Dead Town.

In 2018, Mirabeach completed a 20,000-square-metre expansion.

In 2019, the motorcycle-themed, 35,000-square-metre Ducati World area opened, featuring the world's first spike dueling roller coaster in the world, Desmo Race.

In 2022 the horror house of The Walking Dead opens to replace Legends of Dead Town, moreover the park enters into a collaboration with Nickelodeon, which introduces the most popular cartoon mascots in the park with a meet & greet and a new live show.

Incidents
In 2007, a man was struck by the leg of a female rider on the Katun roller coaster and killed. The rider was injured. The man was in a restricted area when he was hit, but the ride was closed for investigation.

See also 
List of amusement parks in Italy

References

External links
 Official website
 Roller Coasters at Mirabilandia
 Attractions Maps Sat Mirabilandia

Buildings and structures in the Province of Ravenna
Amusement parks in Italy
Parques Reunidos
Tourist attractions in Emilia-Romagna
1992 establishments in Italy
Monorails in Italy
Amusement parks opened in 1992